The Jimmy Carter rabbit incident, sensationalized as the "killer rabbit attack" by the press, involved a swamp rabbit (Sylvilagus aquaticus) that swam toward then-U.S. President Jimmy Carter's fishing boat on April 20, 1979. The incident caught the imagination of the media after Carter's press secretary, Jody Powell, mentioned the event to a correspondent months later.

Political opponents argued that the incident was symbolic of Carter's purported weakness. According to Powell, anti-Carter political commentators went so far as to blame it for the Soviet invasion of Afghanistan and the Iran hostage crisis.

Incident
President Jimmy Carter was fishing in his hometown of Plains, Georgia, on April 20, 1979, alone in a flat-bottomed boat while staff were on land nearby. Carter said a rabbit being chased by hounds "jumped in the water and swam toward my boat. When he got almost there, I splashed some water with a paddle." The animal was in distress or possibly "berserk".

When Carter returned to his office, his staff did not believe his story, saying rabbits could not swim or that one would never approach a person threateningly. However, a White House photographer had taken a picture of the incident, which was released by the Reagan administration.

Media accounts

Associated Press correspondent Brooks Jackson's story on the incident was published August 30, 1979, in various newspapers, including on the front page of The Washington Post with the title "Bunny Goes Bugs: Rabbit Attacks President." The White House did not publicly release a photograph of the event until much later, and the Post printed a cartoon parody of the Jaws poster labeled "PAWS" as its illustration. The White House declined to release the photo to the media until it turned up during the Reagan administration and the story saw a revival.

According to Carter's press secretary Jody Powell, columnist George Will reportedly blamed the Iran hostage crisis on Carter's "timid" response of splashing water towards the rabbit instead of having the Secret Service shoot it. Powell also writes that journalist Robert Novak stated he saw documents that revealed the Soviet invasion of Afghanistan was a result of Carter's purported weakness in the incident.

In his 1986 book The Other Side of the Story, Powell recounted the story:

The incident with the rabbit became fodder for political and ideological opponents who wanted to label Carter's presidency as hapless and enfeebled, although the event's proximity to the U.S. release of the comedy feature film Monty Python and the Holy Grail, which includes scenes of a killer rabbit slaying humans, led to some people describing Carter as having "fended off a killer rabbit" instead. This incident has also made its way into popular culture, as evidenced by its use as a minor theme in the webcomic xkcd.

See also

 Jimmy Carter UFO incident
 George H. W. Bush vomiting incident
 Bill Clinton haircut controversy
 Dick Cheney hunting incident
 Rabbit of Caerbannog
 Bush shoeing incident
 Obama tan suit controversy

References

1979 in Georgia (U.S. state)
Animals in politics
April 1979 events in the United States
Rabbit incident
Individual rabbits
Rabbit incident